Body and Soul is an album by Ray Nance, recorded in 1969.

Recording and music
The album was recorded in May 1969. The tracks are an unusual combination, with originals, jazz standards such as the title track, and more contemporary compositions such as "A Hard Day's Night". Nance plays violin and has some vocals.

Release
The album was released by Solid State Records.

Reception
Both The Penguin Guide to Jazz and AllMusic commented on the moving performance of "Take the 'A' Train", which Nance had played at Billy Strayhorn's funeral.

Track listing
"Take the 'A' Train"
"Get Happy"
"Sunny"
"Body and Soul"
"Mimi"
"A Hard Day's Night"
"Oh Happy Day"
"Stardust"
"She's Funny That Way"
"Jolie Janice"
"Guitar Amour"
"Tranquility"

Personnel
Ray Nance – violin, vocals
Brew Moore – tenor sax
Tiny Grimes – guitar
Tommy Lucas – guitar
Roland Hanna – piano, organ
Jaki Byard – piano
Carl Pruitt – bass
Steve Little – drums

References

1969 albums